Eukaryotic translation initiation factor 4H is a protein that in humans is encoded by the EIF4H gene.

This gene encodes one of the translation initiation factors, which function to stimulate the initiation of protein synthesis at the level of mRNA utilization. 
This gene is deleted in Williams syndrome, a multisystem developmental disorder caused by the deletion of contiguous genes at 7q11.23. Alternative splicing of this gene generates 2 transcript variants.

EIF4H appears analogous to drr-2 in C. elegans which regulates the mTOR pathway and affects longevity.

References

Further reading

External links